"Austerlitz" is the seventh episode of the first season of the HBO satirical comedy-drama television series Succession. It was written by Lucy Prebble and directed by Miguel Arteta, and aired on July 15, 2018.

In the episode, the Roys attend a family therapy session at Connor's ranch in New Mexico, in an attempt to repair Logan's public image in the fallout of a failed vote of no confidence against him. The episode introduces Eric Bogosian in a recurring role as U.S. Senator Gil Eavis, a nemesis of Logan's.

Plot
Kendall has cut off communications with the rest of his family and is suing Logan for firing him from Waystar. Tabloids suggest that Kendall, a recovering drug addict, has relapsed, but Kendall unconvincingly insists to Rava that he has not. Meanwhile, in an effort to fix his public image after the failed no-confidence vote, Logan agrees to a weekend-long family therapy session at Austerlitz, Connor's ranch in New Mexico, which Kendall chooses not to attend.

The first therapy session, conducted by celebrity psychologist Dr. Alon Parfit, proves fruitless. Shiv leaves Austerlitz to meet U.S. Senator and presidential candidate Gil Eavis, a staunch leftist who vehemently opposes Logan and his company. Nate has been attempting to persuade Shiv to work alongside him for Eavis' campaign. Shiv considers the idea more seriously after meeting Eavis, and has a sexual encounter with Nate in his car.

Kendall eventually does arrive in New Mexico and joins some locals on a cocaine and methamphetamine binge. Meanwhile, the rest of the therapy session also proves ineffectual, and Parfit is hospitalized after diving headfirst into a shallow pool and breaking several front teeth. Logan decides to give Roman more responsibilities by placing him in charge of overseeing a company satellite launch out of Japan. Roman, concerned for his brother's well-being, picks Kendall up from his relapse that night and takes him back to the ranch.

Kendall returns to find the rest of the family in a heated argument. Logan demeans Tom and berates Shiv for meeting with his rival Eavis, causing her to leave crying. Logan also admits to planting stories in the tabloids of Kendall's drug use prior to his actual relapse. Still heavily intoxicated, Kendall accuses his father of resenting his children for the privilege in which he raised them, and nearly provokes a physical altercation when he flippantly dismisses the abuse Logan suffered at the hands of his uncle Noah. Marcia breaks up the argument, and Connor admits to Logan that he feels "used" by his father turning Austerlitz into merely another stage for waging his business-related conflicts.

The next morning, the rest of the Roy children leave Austerlitz, and Connor tells his escort girlfriend Willa that he wants to make their relationship exclusive, to which Willa half-heartedly agrees. Logan goes for a private swim with only Marcia present, revealing visible scars across his back, seemingly from his childhood abuse.

Production
"Austerlitz" was written by Lucy Prebble and directed by Miguel Arteta. The episode was filmed on location in various parts of New Mexico including Santa Fe.

The character of Gil Eavis is loosely based on U.S. Senator Bernie Sanders, as several critics have pointed out. Actor Bogosian said that he avoided trying to directly impersonate Sanders in his portrayal, but drew inspiration from the "sense of indignation that wells up from [the] gut" that he observed in Sanders towards issues he is passionate about.

The title of the episode, named after Connor's New Mexico ranch, is derived from the Battle of Austerlitz, a key flashpoint in the Napoleonic Wars. Throughout the series, Connor is shown to have an obsessive fascination with Napoleonic history.

Reception

Ratings
Upon airing, the episode was watched by 0.626 million viewers, with an 18-49 rating of 0.16.

Critical reception
"Austerlitz" received positive reviews, with critics praising Jeremy Strong's performance and the episode's balance between humor and darker themes. Randall Colburn of The A.V. Club gave the episode a B, calling Strong "fucking fantastic" in his portrayal of Kendall's relapse. Colburn also praised the episode for framing its exploration of aristocratic privilege and resentment through Logan, the series' "richest and most powerful character." Vox felt the episode was a "neat microcosm" of the series in the way it balanced comedy and melodrama, and described the episode as a "showcase for each character's human flaws and insecurities, as the pretext of a family sit-down brings every character together under a single roof and holds a magnifying glass to the bonds between them." The review also praised Strong for giving "perhaps the most impressive performance on the show," comparing Kendall's arc in the episode to that of Peter Capaldi's character in Succession showrunner Jesse Armstrong's previous series, The Thick Of It. Sean T. Collins of Decider was less positive about the episode, criticizing Shiv's subplot as "dull" and finding the reveal regarding Logan's past to be an unconvincing development for his character. However, Collins reserved praise for Strong, saying that his performance as Kendall worked "beautifully and unequivocally," and called his depiction of Kendall's relapse "gripping."

References

External links
 "Austerlitz" at HBO
 

2018 American television episodes
Succession (TV series)